Paskvan is a surname. Notable people with the surname include:

George Paskvan (1918–2005), American football fullback 
Joe Paskvan (born 1952), American attorney and politician